Karavan is an Estonian vocal-instrumental band, which was established in 1983.

In 1984, 1985 and 1986, the band was named as "the best band of the year".

The band was accompanied the participant Silvi Vrait in Eurovision Song Contest 1994.

Members
Members since 1997:
 Agu Tammeorg
 Margus Martmaa
 Aarne Saluveer
 Meelis Pundar.

Discography

Albums
"Kauneid jõule"
"Raimond Valgre laule"
"Kutse tantsule. 13 popurriid"

References

Estonian musical groups